Zamora is one of the 21 municipalities (municipios) that makes up the Venezuelan state of Miranda and, according to a 2016 population estimate by the National Institute of Statistics of Venezuela, the municipality has a population of 218,911.  The town of Guatire is the municipal seat of the Zamora Municipality.

Name
The municipality is one of several named "Zamora Municipality" for the 19th century Venezuelan soldier Ezequiel Zamora.

History

The region was historically an agricultural area that cultivated various export products. The population of Guatire has increased rapidly in recent years as an east suburb of Caracas.

Geography

The municipality's northern border, separating it from Vargas, is the east part of the Costa (or Caribe) Mountain Range, while the lower Caraballo Ridge comprises its southern border.  Grande River (also called Guarenas River or Caucagua River) runs from the west to the southeast.  Guatire, the municipality's shire town, is located near the western border.

Demographics
The Zamora Municipality, according to a 2016 population estimate by the National Institute of Statistics of Venezuela, has a population of 218,911 (up from 164,726 in 2000). This amounts to 6.6% of the state's population.

Government
The mayor of the Zamora Municipality is Solamey Blanco Sojo, elected on October 31, 2004, with 29% of the vote.  He replaced Gerardo Rojas shortly after the elections.  The municipality is divided into two parishes; Guatire and Bolívar.

References

External links
 zamora-miranda.gob.ve]  

Municipalities of Miranda (state)